"Rapper's Ball" is a song by American rap artist E-40, featuring rapper Too $hort and Jodeci lead singer Cedric "K-Ci" Hailey. It is a single from the lead rapper's 1996 album Tha Hall of Game and is a B-side for E-40's song "Things'll Never Change", featuring The Dove Shack rapper Bo-Rock. The song peaked at #29 on the U.S. Billboard Hot 100 chart along with "Things'll Never Change", becoming E-40's most successful song as a lead artist until "U and Dat" featuring T-Pain and Kandi Girl peaked at #13 on the Hot 100 in 2006. This song is considered a classic by most west coast rap fans, especially in E-40's hometown Vallejo which is in the East Bay of the San Francisco Bay Area. This song is also notable for featuring a diss to Brooklyn rapper The Notorious B.I.G. in which E-40 says, "Don't buy an $85,000 car before you buy a house", making reference to Biggie owning expensive cars but still not having purchased his own home. In the video, Tupac Shakur, who makes a cameo appearance, winks at the camera when this line is said. This song is also one of Too Short's successful songs amongst many Platinum Albums Too Short has recorded with other Bay Area HipHop Rap Legend.  Later several Top Artists around the Bay would collaborate on the Album The Whole Damn Yay T.W.D.Y. a west coast supergroup formed by Ant Banks and released in 1999.  The music video also features another Rap artist from the Bay Area most known for his Raw Gangsta Rap lyrics, Ice-T arriving with Too Short & playing pool with Tupac, albeit doesn't perform.

Music video
The music video was filmed on July 13, 1996. It features cameos by Tupac Shakur, Ice-T, Mack 10, Joe Clair, Richie Rich, and B-Legit. The music video was released for the week ending on September 1, 1996.

Charts

Weekly charts

References 

1996 singles
1996 songs
E-40 songs
Too Short songs
Jive Records singles
Songs written by E-40
Songs written by Too Short